Rudak may refer to:
 Rudak, Fars
 Rudak, Qazvin
 Rudak, Tehran

See also
 Rudaki (disambiguation)